Henry Clowes (1 July 1863 – 6 April 1899) was an English cricketer.  Clowes was a right-handed batsman who occasionally fielded as a wicket-keeper.  He was born at Cheadle, Cheshire, and educated at Cheltenham College.

Clowes made his first-class debut for Gloucestershire against Sussex in 1884.  He made three further first-class appearances for the county in that season, the last of which came against Sussex.  In his four first-class appearances for Gloucestershire, Clowes scored a total of 82 runs at an average of 10.25, with a high score of 22.

He died at Bloomsbury, London on 6 April 1899.

References

External links
Henry Clowes at ESPNcricinfo
Henry Clowes at CricketArchive

1863 births
1899 deaths
People from Cheadle, Greater Manchester
People educated at Cheltenham College
English cricketers
Gloucestershire cricketers
Sportspeople from Gloucestershire